Hans is a commune in the Marne department in north-eastern France.

History
During the Battle of Valmy the castle of Hans was the headquarters of Charles William Ferdinand, Duke of Brunswick, commander of the Prussian army.

See also
Communes of the Marne department

References

Communes of Marne (department)